Interstate 29 (I-29) is a north–south Interstate Highway in the Midwestern United States that begins in Missouri. It travels through the Kansas City and St. Joseph metropolitan areas before exiting the state and entering Iowa. Almost all of I-29 in Missouri lies in an area called the Platte Purchase that was not originally part of Missouri when the state entered the Union in 1821.

Route description
I-29 begins at I-70 in Kansas City in a concurrency with I-35 and U.S. Route 71 (US 71) at the Downtown Loop. It crosses over the Missouri River via the Bond Bridge. I-29 and I-35 separate in northern Kansas City, with I-29 turning northwest with US 71 running concurrent with it. It passes near Kansas City International Airport and near there is concurrent with I-435. I-29 then exits the Kansas City area. It enters the eastern portion of St. Joseph while downtown St. Joseph is served by I-229, a loop of I-29. After exiting St. Joseph, US 71 separates from I-29.

History
I-70 east to I-435 south was alternate a via route for traffic to void the 3 at-grade crossings.

During the 2019 Midwestern US floods, I-29 in Missouri was closed to traffic in both directions from St. Joseph to Council Bluffs, Iowa when the highway got flooded. It reopened to traffic by October 2019.

Exit list

Auxiliary route
I-29 has one auxiliary route in Missouri:
: A bypass around the west side of St. Joseph

References

Explanatory notes

Citations

External links

 Interstate-Guide.com, Interstate 29

29
 Missouri
Transportation in Jackson County, Missouri
Transportation in Clay County, Missouri
Transportation in Platte County, Missouri
Transportation in Buchanan County, Missouri
Transportation in Andrew County, Missouri
Transportation in Holt County, Missouri
Transportation in Atchison County, Missouri
Transportation in the Kansas City metropolitan area